Craig Day was a baseball and American football player for the Georgia Tech Yellow Jackets at the Georgia Institute of Technology. A pitcher on the baseball team from 1903 to 1906, his 12 complete games in 1905 and 6 career shutouts is still a record. He posted a record of 24–8. He beat Arthur Bradsher of Trinity in 1905 in what was dubbed the "greatest game in Dixie" before the 1908 Nashville v. New Orleans game. He and Ed Lafitte were teammates at Tech. Day was an end on the football team. He was inducted into the Georgia Tech Hall of Fame in 1962.

References

Baseball pitchers
Georgia Tech Yellow Jackets baseball players
Georgia Tech Yellow Jackets football players